The Oak Ridges Dynes are a defunct Junior "B" ice hockey team from Oak Ridges, Ontario, Canada.  They started in the Mid-Ontario Jr.B league, then moved to the Central Junior B Hockey League in 1978 when the Mid-Ontario league folded.  The Dynes only lasted 4 more seasons, in two different towns.

Richmond Hill Dynes 1975 - 1976
Oak Ridges Dynes 1976 - 1981
Richmond Hill Dynes 1981 - 1982

Season-by-Season results

Defunct ice hockey teams in Canada
Ice hockey teams in Ontario